The Indooroopilly Railway Bridge is a railway bridge of steel truss design which crosses the Brisbane River, Queensland, Australia. The Indooroopilly Railway Bridge links Indooroopilly and Chelmer stations, and has two long spans with one central pier. It was built just upstream and parallel to the Albert Bridge as part of the quadruplication of the Ipswich Line between 1955 and 1957.

History

The present bridge is 208.5 metres long with two equal spans. The Coordinator-General's Department designed the bridge and the Electric Power Transmission Pty Coy was the construction contractor. The superstructure was designed as a parallel chord truss bridge, fabricated in Italy by the Societa Anonima Elettrificazione S.P.A.

See also
Bridges over the Brisbane River

References

Railway bridges in Queensland
Bridges in Brisbane
Bridges completed in 1957
History of Brisbane
Bridges over the Brisbane River
Steel bridges in Australia
Indooroopilly, Queensland
Chelmer, Queensland
Truss bridges in Australia